Boštjan Žnuderl (born 17 January 1979) is a retired Slovenian footballer who played as a midfielder. He played for Maribor and Celje in the Slovenian PrvaLiga. He also played for various clubs in the Austrian lower divisions.

Honours
Maribor
Slovenian Championship: 1997–98, 2001–02, 2002–03
Slovenian Cup: 2003–04

References

External links
NZS profile 
NK Maribor profile 

1979 births
Living people
Slovenian footballers
Slovenia youth international footballers
Slovenia under-21 international footballers
Association football midfielders
NK Maribor players
NK Železničar Maribor players
NK Celje players
Slovenian PrvaLiga players
Slovenian Second League players
Slovenian expatriate footballers
Slovenian expatriate sportspeople in Austria
Expatriate footballers in Austria
Slovenian football managers